Southburn railway station was a railway station on the Selby to Driffield Line. It opened on 1 May 1890 and served the villages of Southburn and Kirkburn in the East Riding of Yorkshire, England. It closed on 20 September 1954 but the line remained open as a through route for excursions until complete closure on 14 June 1965. Little remains of the station with the exception of the platform edges and the station cottages. A farm building occupies the place of the demolished station building.

References

External links
 Southburn station on navigable 1947 O. S. map

Disused railway stations in the East Riding of Yorkshire
Former North Eastern Railway (UK) stations
Railway stations in Great Britain opened in 1890
Railway stations in Great Britain closed in 1954